Berberis chiapensis is a shrub in the family Berberidaceae described as a species in 1940. It is endemic to the State of Chiapas in southern Mexico.

References

External links
photo of herbarium specimen at Missouri Botanical Garden, isotype of Berberis chiapensis (Lundell) Lundell 

chiapensis
Endemic flora of Mexico
Flora of Chiapas
Plants described in 1940